Hyalurga clara is a moth of the family Erebidae. It was described by Arthur Gardiner Butler in 1873. It is found in Brazil.

References

 Arctiidae genus list at Butterflies and Moths of the World of the Natural History Museum

Hyalurga
Moths described in 1873